is the long-running anime sequel to the Dragon Ball TV series, adapted from the final twenty-six volumes of the Dragon Ball manga written by Akira Toriyama. The manga portion of the series debuted in Weekly Shōnen Jump on October 4, 1988, and lasted until 1995; the anime adaptation premiered in Japan on Fuji Television on April 26, 1989, taking over its predecessor's time slot, and ran until its end on January 31, 1996, lasting 291 episodes in Japan, and 276 episodes in the United States originally, although all 291 episodes were later broadcast when content from the first 67 episodes was restored.

Dragon Ball Z uses four pieces of theme music in the Japanese version. From episodes 1–199, the opening theme is "Cha-La Head-Cha-La" by Hironobu Kageyama, and the closing theme is "Detekoi Tobikiri Zenkai Pawā!" by MANNA. From episodes 200–291, the opening and closing themes are "We Gotta Power" and "Boku-Tachi wa Tenshi Datta," both by Hironobu Kageyama.

Series overview
In Japan, Dragon Ball Z was aired year-round continuously, with regular off-days for sporting events and television specials taking place about once every six weeks on average. The English broadcast was divided into eight separate near-continuous blocks with breaks varying between four months to over a year between each block. Only in one instance, between episodes 194 and 195, was there actually parity between the DVD release and the actual broadcast sequence in terms of the end of one "season" and the beginning of the next.

Episode list

Season 1: Saiyan Saga (1989–1990)

Season 2: Namek and Captain Ginyu Sagas (1990–91)

Season 3: Frieza Saga (1991)

Season 4: Garlic Jr., Trunks and Androids Sagas (1991–92)

Season 5: Imperfect Cell and Perfect Cell Sagas (1992)

Season 6: Cell Games Saga (1992–93)

Season 7: Other World, Great Saiyaman and World Tournament Sagas (1993–94)

Season 8: Babidi and Majin Buu Sagas (1994–95)

Season 9: Fusion, Kid Buu and Peaceful World Sagas (1995–96)

OVAs/Movie specials

TV specials

See also

List of Dragon Ball Z home video releases
List of Dragon Ball episodes
List of Dragon Ball GT episodes
List of Dragon Ball films

Notes

References

External links

 Official Funimation Entertainment Dragon Ball Z episode list
 

Dragon Ball Z
Z

ja:ドラゴンボールZ